Bryneglwys Fault is a geological fault in Wales.

See also
List of geological faults of Wales

Geology of Wales
Seismic faults of the United Kingdom